The Capuchin Poor Clares is a Catholic religious order of Pontifical Right for women founded in Naples, Italy, in 1538, by Ven. Maria Lorenza Longo. The order still exists and it now has communities in the United States. Members are referred to as Capuchinesses.

History
Maria Laurenza Longo had built a hospital and house that cared for prostitutes. The first community of nuns was formed in 1538, organised by priests from the Theatine order. (The Theatines had been formed fourteen years earlier.) This new body was soon organised not by the Theatines but by the Order of Friars Minor Capuchin, usually known as Capuchins.  The Capuchin Poor Clares follow the original ideals of St. Francis of Assisi and St. Clare of Assisi. The Capuchin Poor Clares are a cloistered community of contemplative religious sisters. Longo wanted to re-establish the original concepts of religious simplicity, selfless poverty and the austerity of St. Francis of Assisi and St. Clare of Assisi set by Matteo da Bascio when he founded the order of the Capuchin friars. Longo's new order took the same habit design as the men. Like the friars, the nuns wear a simple brown tunic knotted with a cord at the waist and a short cape. The only addition for nuns was a wimple and a black veil.

A notable member of the order was Saint Veronica Giuliani who joined the order in Città di Castello in Italy in 1677. She rose to be a mystic and abbess, and in 1839 she was canonised by Pope Gregory XVI.

In America
In the United States, the Capuchin Poor Clares have monasteries in Wilmington, Delaware, Amarillo, Texas, Alamo, Texas, Denver, Colorado, and Pueblo, Colorado.

At Our Lady of Light Monastery in Denver there are nine professed sisters. The monastery in Denver was founded by Capuchin Poor Clare sisters from Irapuato in central Mexico in 1988. In addition to sewing habits, the sisters provide for the needs of their community by making and selling cookies.

Notable people
 Inés de Guerrico Eguses (Sor María Jacinta; 1793-1840), nun, writer
 St. Veronica Giuliani, stigmatist

References

External links
 Capuchin Poor Clares
 Capuchin Poor Clares of USA

 
1538 establishments in Europe
Religious organizations established in the 1530s